Visa requirements for Azerbaijani citizens are administrative entry restrictions by the authorities of other states placed on citizens of Azerbaijan. As of 13 April 2021, Azerbaijani citizens had visa-free or visa on arrival access to 67 countries and territories, ranking the Azerbaijani passport 76th in terms of travel freedom according to the Henley Passport Index.



Visa requirements map

Visa requirements

Visa facilitation

Non-visa restrictions

See also

 Visa policy of Azerbaijan
 Azerbaijani passport

Notes

References

External links
 Republic of Azerbaijan Ministry of Foreign Affairs 

Azerbaijan
Foreign relations of Azerbaijan